The Lavonia Commercial Historic District in Lavonia, Georgia, is a  historic district which was listed on the National Register of Historic Places in 1983. The listing included 18 contributing buildings.

It includes the historic commercial center of Lavonia, mostly one- and two-story brick commercial buildings.

Gallery

References

Historic districts on the National Register of Historic Places in Georgia (U.S. state)
National Register of Historic Places in Franklin County, Georgia